Hinchinbrook is the name of several places and ships, ultimately named for Edward Montagu, 1st Earl of Sandwich, Viscount Hinchinbrooke:

Places
 Hinchinbrook, New South Wales, a suburb of Sydney, Australia
 Hinchinbrook Island, an island in tropical north Queensland, Australia
 Electoral district of Hinchinbrook a state parliamentary district in North Queensland Australia
 Shire of Hinchinbrook a local government area in North Queensland, centred on Ingham, Queensland
 Hinchinbrook Island (Alaska), a barrier island protecting Prince William Sound in Alaska
 Hinchinbrook Channel, a channel adjacent to Hinchinbrook Island

Ships
 , one of four vessels of the British Royal Navy

See also
 Hinchinbrooke (disambiguation)
 Hinchingbrooke (disambiguation)